Government Islamia College, Gujranwala, officially Government Postgraduate Islamia College Gujranwala, founded as Guru Nanak Khalsa College, is an educational institution in the city of Gujranwala in the Punjab province of Pakistan. It is a well-known institute located in the heart of Gujranwala.

History
Islamia College Gujranwala was established in 1912 as Khalsa High School Gujranwala with the donation of Khalsa Committee, a Sikh educational trust. Sir Louis Dane, the 13th governor of Punjab, laid its foundation. Just six years later on 30 March 1918, it was upgraded to the status of a college and named Guru Nanak Khalsa College Gujranwala. It is one of the oldest colleges of the Punjab. 

After the partition of India, Anjuman-i-Islamia Gujranwala took possession of this college and after migration Khalsa Education Council established a new college with same name called Gujranwala Guru Nanak Khalsa College. On 25 November 1947, the institution was renamed Islamia College Gujranwala. 

In September 1972, the college was nationalized and in 1990 it was upgraded to post-graduate level.

Affiliation with Punjab University
Islamia College Gujranwala is affiliated with the University of the Punjab, Lahore, Pakistan.

Notable alumni

Politicians
 Muhammad Rafiq Tarar, former President of Pakistan

Civil Servants
 Altaf Gauhar, civil servant and administrator

Journalists
 Wajahat Masood, journalist, political analyst

See also 

Gujranwala Guru Nanak Khalsa College

References

External links
Government Postgraduate Islamia College Gujranwala - Official website

I
Public universities and colleges in Punjab, Pakistan
1912 establishments in British India